Resurrection is the second studio album by Chicago rapper Twista, who had released his first album under the name Tung Twista. Along with the name and label change, the rapper slowed his flow slightly and deepened his voice; he also took to darker, rougher production, provided by his then-DJ, DJ-I.C. Dre. Though the album was released only in Chicago—possibly due to marketing conflicts with fellow Chicago rapper Common's own successful and similarly titled sophomore effort Resurrection, released exactly 2 weeks prior—it served as a template for Twista's seminal Adrenaline Rush, released three years later. This album is somewhat famous for the song "Suicide", which takes shot at group Naughty by Nature (It was a response for the group, after they stated that Twista's fast rap style was all show and a gimmick).

Track listing

References 

Twista albums
1994 albums
Atlantic Records albums

fi:Adrenaline Rush